The 2000 Cupa României Final was the 62nd final of Romania's most prestigious cup competition. The final was played at the Stadionul Naţional in Bucharest on 13 May 2000 and was contested between Divizia A sides Dinamo București and Universitatea Craiova. The cup was won by Dinamo.

Route to the final

Match details

References

External links
 Official site 

Cupa Romaniei Final, 2000
Cupa României Finals
2000